This article presents the military ranks of the entire Polish Armed Forces as well as the rank insignia used today. The system of rank insignia is a direct descendant of various systems used throughout history by the Polish Army. Some of the grades trace their name back to the Middle Ages, for instance the rank of  literally means a flag bearer or an Ensign.

Names of Polish ranks are often of foreign origin, like the ones introduced by the 17th-century mercenaries serving for the Polish Crown.

As the structure of Polish rank names substantially differs from the English one, it seems more appropriate to give the U.S. or U.K. equivalent ranks, based on the common NATO codes, rather than to provide a literal translation which can lead to numerous misinterpretations.

Origins 
Most rank titles are cognates to the ones in English, with some exceptions. Notably colonel's literal meaning is regimental-leader, likewise  means platoon-leader.

Until World War II, each of the branches of the Land Forces used a set of different names for the same grades. This is similar to the German army calling a cavalry officer which is equivalent to Hauptmann a Rittmeister

Modern Polish military practices were heavily influenced by Prussian/German and Russian traditions, as most founding officers after 1918 independence were veterans of those respective armies.

Marshal of Poland 

Marshal of Poland is the highest rank in the Polish Armed Forces. Note that unlike the remaining ranks, it does not belong to any particular service but to the armed forces as a whole. So far only six individuals have been promoted to this rank. With the death of the last surviving holder, Michał Rola-Żymierski in 1989 the rank of Marshal of Poland has been vacant.

Customs 
The Polish language requires the use of a prior honorific before stating the addressee's rank e.g. '' (Sir Captain...). This is directly equivalent to French practice where the possessive  is pre-pended to the addressee's rank. During the communist period use of the formal 'Pan' (Sir) was frowned upon and 'Obywatel' (Citizen) was used. This has reverted to prior style in the post-communist era.

It is customary to include other titles when referring to an officer in writing. This can lead to some interesting abbreviations. For example, a Lt. Col. in the airforce by the name Nowak who is a pilot and has an MSc in engineering would be written  (LtCol plt MEng Nowak).

Uniquely, Polish forces use a two-fingered version of the salute, and the saluting custom does not allow saluting with the fingers to the head without having headgear on (cap/beret or helmet).

Land Forces, Territorial Defence Force and Special Forces

Commissioned Ranks

Non-Commissioned Ranks and Privates

Military Gendarmerie 

Officers

Enlisted

Air Force

Commissioned Ranks

Non-Commissioned Ranks and Airmen

Navy

Commissioned Ranks

Petty Officers and Seamen

Obsolete Ranks

Ranks Discontinued on 1 July 2004

Other changes after July 1, 2004 
On July 1, 2004, the number of these ranks was reduced and they were included in the group of non-commissioned ranks.

Pay Grade changes on July 1, 2004 
: OR-8 to OR-9
: OR-8 to OR-7
: OR-3 to OR-4

Thus the ranks discontinued on July 1, 2004, were officially abolished in the Polish Armed Forces.

Historical Ranks in the Polish Armed Forces

See also 
 Certified officer, a title in Polish Armed Forces
 Police ranks of Poland
 Ranks and insignia of NATO Armies
 Comparative military ranks
 Polish Scouts rank insignia

Notes

References 

 Polish Armed Forces Insignia in the International Encyclopedia of Uniform Insignia